FabricLive.49 is a 2009 album by Buraka Som Sistema. The album was released as part of the FabricLive Mix Series.

Track listing
Dre Skull ft. Sizzla - Gone Too Far (Buraka Som Sistema Remix) - Mixpak Records
Buraka Som Sistema - General (Stenchman Mix) - fabric
Buraka Som Sistema - General (L-VIS 1990 Mix) - fabric
Ku Bo ft. Anbuley - Tsu Bo - Man
DJ Znobia - Pausa - Enchufada
Buraka Som Sistema - Kurum (Roulet Mix) - fabric
Seductive - Underground Sound - Döner Digital Records/Maniax Music
Diplo & Laidback Luke - Hey - Southern Fried
Buraka Som Sistema - IC19 (A1 Bassline Attack Mix) - fabric
L-VIS 1990 - United Groove (Buraka Som Sistema Remix) - Mad Decent
Skream - Fick - Tempa
DJ Riot - Mermaid Dub - Faster Music
Zomby - Dynamite Sandwich - Unreleased
Crime Mob ft. Lil Scrappy - Rock Yo Hips - WEA
DJ Znobia - Danca Da Mae Ju (Buraka Som Sistema Edit) - Enchufada
Batida - Bazuka (Quem Me Rusgou?) - Difference
Yolanda Be Cool - Afro Nuts (Douster Remix) - Sweat It Out!
Solo - Joga Bola - DeadFish
Buraka Som Sistema ft. Deize Tigrona - Aqui Para Voces (Buratronic Mix) - fabric
Djedjotronic - Gum Attack - Boysnoize
2 Tracks Mixed:
Harvard Bass - Caked - Institubes
Buraka Som Sistema ft. Pongolove - Kalemba (Wegue Wegue) (Acapella) - fabric
Mastiksoul - Run For Cover (Dub Mix) - Vidisco
Nova Lima - Machete - Mr Bongo
DJ Malvado - Puto Mekie - Unreleased
Buraka Som Sistema - Luanda-Lisboa (Nic Sarno Mix) - fabric
SonicC - Stickin - MixMash
Major Lazer - Bruk Out (Buraka Som Sistema Mix) - Universal
Buraka Som Sistema ft. Bruno M - Tiroza (Bert on Beats Remix) - fabric

References

External links
Fabric: FabricLive.49

Fabric (club) albums
2009 compilation albums